Manca Marcelan, MA in Psychology, born 17 July 1995 in Ljubljana, Slovenia  is an athlete, rhythmic gymnast.

Athlete of year 2008 selected by the Gymnastics Association of Slovenia. In 2018 became psychologist (University of Ljubljana FF).
In July 2020 Manca Marcelan the degree of Master of Arts in Psychology.

Success at home
 Trophy champion of Slovenia, Team 2010 
 National Champion with team 2010
 National Champion 2009, around gymnastics, 
 Juniors - Slovenia Trophy winner, 
 National Champion with team 2009, Champion with ball in 2009 
 National Champion, Champion with ball 2006 
 Slovenia Trophy winner, Team 2006 
 National Champion, group winner 2005

Success abroad
 European Junior Championships Bremen (Germany) 2010, Team 19th place 
 Alpe Adria (Italy), Team 2008, 1st place 
 Slovenian Challenge (Slovenia) 2008, 3rd  place all around, 2nd place ball, 3rd place hoop 
 MTM Narodni dom Ljubljana (Slovenia) 2008, 1st place 
 International tournament Nitra (Slovakia) 2008, 2nd place
 International tournament Mol (Belgium) 2008, 3rd place
 Alpe Adria (Italy) 2007, Team, 1st place
 International tournament Brno (Czech Republic) 2006, group exercises, 1st place
 MTM Narodni dom Ljubljana (Slovenia) 2006, 3rd place  
 Alpe Adria (Italy) 2006, Team, 1st place
 New Year's Cup Moste (Slovenia) 2005, 3rd place 
 International Tournament of Udine (Italy) 2003, 1st place

References

External links

https://www.youtube.com/watch?v=hp80JFO_DBw

Slovenian rhythmic gymnasts
Living people
Sportspeople from Ljubljana
1995 births